Valeriy Stepanskoy is a paralympic athlete from Russia competing mainly in category T38 running events.

He competed in the 2000 Summer Paralympics in Sydney, Australia winning a silver in the 800m and competing in the 400m and 5000m.  He also competed in the 2004 Summer Paralympics in the 400m and 800m but could not add further to his medal tally.

References

Paralympic athletes of Russia
Athletes (track and field) at the 2000 Summer Paralympics
Athletes (track and field) at the 2004 Summer Paralympics
Paralympic silver medalists for Russia
Living people
Medalists at the 2000 Summer Paralympics
Year of birth missing (living people)
Paralympic medalists in athletics (track and field)
Russian male middle-distance runners
21st-century Russian people